The 1968 Gent–Wevelgem was the 30th edition of the Gent–Wevelgem cycle race and was held on 16 April 1968. The race started in Ghent and finished in Wevelgem. The race was won by Walter Godefroot of the Flandria team.

General classification

References

Gent–Wevelgem
1968 in road cycling
1968 in Belgian sport
March 1968 sports events in Europe